The 79th season of the Campeonato Gaúcho kicked off on March 7, 1999 and ended on June 20, 1999. Thirty teams participated. Grêmio beat Internacional in the finals and won their 32nd title. Sixteen teams were relegated.

Participating teams

System 
The championship would have seven stages:

 Division A: The eighteen teams that had qualified to Division A in the previous year were divided into three groups of six, in which each team played the teams of its own group in a double round-robin system. The four best teams in each group qualified to the Second phase, while the bottom two teams went to the Repechage. Caxias and Santo Ângelo, due to their performance in the 1998 Copa Ênio Andrade, were automatically qualified regardless of placing and earned an extra point in the Second phase.
 Division B: The eight teams that had qualified to Division B in the previous year joined the four teams that had been promoted from the Second level, and were divided into two groups of six, in which each team played the teams of its own group in a double round-robin system. the best team in each group qualified to the Repechage, while the others were relegated to the Second level of that same year.
 Second phase: The twelve remaining teams were divided into three groups of four, in which each team played the teams of its own group in a double round-robin system. The two best teams in each group qualified to the Quarterfinals.
 Repechage: The eight teams that had qualified to the repechage were divided into two groups of four, in which each team played the teams of its own group in a double round-robin system. The best team in each group qualified to the Quarterfinals. The six eliminated teams would also be relegated to the Second level.
 Quarterfinals: The eight remaining teams would play in two-legged knockout ties, with the winners going to the Semifinals.
 Semifinals: The semifinals would be played in an up-to-three matches series, with a team advancing after getting at least five points.
 Finals: Would be disputed in the same format as the Semifinals, with the winner being declared champions.

Championship

Division A

Group 1

Group 2

Group 3

Division B

Group 1

Group 2

Second phase

Group 4

Group 5

Group 6

Repechage

Group 3

Group 4

Quarterfinals

Semifinals 

|}

Finals 

|}

References 

Campeonato Gaúcho seasons
Gaúcho